"The Snow Queen" is an original fairy tale by Danish author Hans Christian Andersen. It was first published 21 December 1844 in New Fairy Tales. First Volume. Second Collection (Nye Eventyr. Første Bind. Anden Samling). The story centers on the struggle between good and evil as experienced by Gerda and her friend, Kai.

The story is one of Andersen's longest and most highly acclaimed stories. It is regularly included in selected tales and collections of his work and is frequently reprinted in illustrated storybook editions for children.

Story

The devil, in the form of an evil troll, has made a magic mirror that distorts the appearance of everything that it reflects. The magic mirror fails to reflect the good and beautiful aspects of people and things, and magnifies their bad and ugly aspects. The devil, who is headmaster at a troll school, takes the mirror and his pupils throughout the world, delighting in using it to distort everyone and everything.  They attempt to carry the mirror into heaven in order to make fools of the angels and God, but the higher they lift it, the more the mirror shakes as they laugh, and it slips from their grasp and falls back to earth, shattering into billions of pieces, some no larger than a grain of sand.  The splinters are blown by the wind all over the Earth and get into people's hearts and eyes, freezing their hearts like blocks of ice and making their eyes like the troll-mirror itself, seeing only the bad and ugly in people and things.

Years later, a little boy Kai (often spelled "Kay" or "Kaj" in translations) and a little girl Gerda live next door to each other in the garrets of buildings with adjoining roofs in a large city. They could get from one's home to the other's just by stepping over the gutters of each building. The two families grow vegetables and roses in window boxes placed on the gutters. Gerda and Kai have a window box garden to play in, and they become devoted to each other as playmates, and as close as if they were siblings.

Kai's grandmother tells the children about the Snow Queen, who is ruler over the "snow bees" — snowflakes that look like bees. As bees have a queen, so do the snow bees, and she is seen where the snowflakes cluster the most. Looking out of his frosted window one winter, Kai sees the Snow Queen, who beckons him to come with her. Kai draws back in fear from the window.

By the following spring, Gerda has learned a song that she sings to Kai:  Because roses adorn the window box garden, the sight of roses always reminds Gerda of her love for Kai.

On a pleasant summer day, splinters of the troll-mirror get into Kai's heart and eyes. Kai becomes cruel and aggressive. He destroys their window-box garden, he makes fun of his grandmother, and he no longer cares about Gerda, since everyone now appears bad and ugly to him. The only beautiful and perfect things to him now are the tiny snowflakes that he sees through a magnifying glass.

The following winter, Kai goes out with his sledge to play in the snowy market square and hitches it to a curious white sleigh carriage, driven by the Snow Queen, who appears as a woman in a white fur-coat. Outside the city she reveals herself to Kai and kisses him twice: once to numb him from the cold, and a second time to make him forget about Gerda and his family; a third kiss would kill him. She takes Kai in her sleigh to her palace. The people of the city conclude that Kai died in the nearby river. Gerda, heartbroken, goes out the next summer, to look for him and questions everyone and everything about Kai's whereabouts. She offers her new red shoes to the river in exchange for Kai; by not taking the gift at first, the river lets her know that Kai did not drown. So Gerda climbs into a boat and the river carries her away, to start her on the right path.

Gerda next visits an old sorceress with a beautiful garden of eternal summer. The sorceress wants Gerda to stay with her forever, so she causes Gerda to forget Kai, and causes all the roses in her garden to sink beneath the earth, since she knows that the sight of them will remind Gerda of her friend. However, a while later, whilst playing in the garden, Gerda sees a rose on the sorceress's hat, then remembers Kai and begins to cry. Gerda's warm tears raise one bush above the ground, and it tells her that it could see all the dead while it was under the earth, and Kai is not among them. So she interrogates the other flowers in the garden, but they only know a single story each, which they sing to her. Realizing that they cannot help her find Kai, Gerda flees the garden of eternal summer and realizes that it's already autumn. She has wasted a lot of time, and has no warm clothes to wear.

Gerda flees and meets a crow, who tells her that Kai is in the princess's palace. Gerda goes to the palace and meets the princess and the prince, who is not Kai but looks like him. Gerda tells them her story, and they provide her with warm clothes and a beautiful coach. While traveling in the coach Gerda is captured by robbers and brought to their castle, where she befriends a little robber girl, whose pet doves tell her that they saw Kai when he was carried away by the Snow Queen in the direction of Lapland. The captive reindeer Bae tells her that he knows how to get to Lapland since it is his home.

The robber girl frees Gerda and the reindeer to travel north to the Snow Queen's palace. They make two stops: first at the Lapp woman's home and then at the Finn woman's home. The Finn woman tells the reindeer that the secret of Gerda's unique power to save Kai is in her sweet and innocent child's heart:

When Gerda reaches the Snow Queen's palace, she is halted by the snowflakes guarding it. She prays the Lord's Prayer, which causes her breath to take the shape of angels, who resist the snowflakes and allow Gerda to enter the palace. Gerda finds Kai alone and almost immobile on a frozen lake, which the Snow Queen calls the "Mirror of Reason", on which her throne sits. Kai is engaged in the task that the Snow Queen gave him: he must use pieces of ice like a Chinese puzzle to form characters and words. If he is able to form the word the Snow Queen told him to spell she will release him from her power and give him a pair of skates.

Gerda runs up to Kai and kisses him, and he is saved by the power of her love: Gerda weeps warm tears on him, melting his heart and burning away the troll-mirror splinter in it. As a result, Kai bursts into tears, which dislodge the splinter from his eye, and becomes cheerful and healthy again. He remembers Gerda, and the two dance around so joyously that the splinters of ice Kai had been playing with are caught up into the dance.  When they tire of dancing the splinters fall down to spell "eternity," the very word Kai was trying to spell. Kai and Gerda leave the Snow Queen's domain with the help of the reindeer, the Finn woman, and the Lapp woman. They meet the robber girl, and from there they walk back to their home.  Kai and Gerda find that everything at home is the same and that it is they who have changed; they are now grown up, and are also delighted to see that it is summertime.

At the end, the grandmother reads a passage from the Bible:

Characters

 Gerda, the protagonist and the main heroine of this tale, who succeeds in finding her friend Kai and saving him from the Snow Queen.
 Kai in Danish and Norwegian (often spelled Kay or Kaj in other European languages including English), a little boy who lives in a large city, in the garret of a building across the street from the home of Gerda, his playmate, whom he loves dearly. He falls victim to the splinters of the troll-mirror and the blandishments of the Snow Queen.
 The Snow Queen (Snedronningen), queen of the snowflakes or "snow bees", who travels throughout the world with the snow. Her palace and gardens are in the lands of permafrost, specifically Spitsbergen. She takes Kai back to this palace after he has fallen victim to the splinters of the troll-mirror. She promises to free Kai if he can spell "eternity" with the pieces of ice in her palace.
 The Troll (Trolden) or the Devil (Djævlen), who makes an evil mirror that distorts reality and later shatters to infect people with its splinters that distort sight and freeze hearts. Some English translations of "The Snow Queen" translate this character as the "sprite" or the "hobgoblin".
 The Grandmother (Bedstemoderen), Kai's grandmother, who tells him and Gerda the legend of the Snow Queen. Some of Grandmother's actions are essential points of the story.
 The Old Lady who Knew Magic (den gamle Kone der kunne Trolddom), who maintains a cottage on the river, with a garden that is permanently in summer. She seeks to keep Gerda with her, but Gerda's thought of roses (the flower most favoured by herself and Kai) awakens her from the old woman's enchantment.
 The Crow (Kragen), who thinks that the new prince of his land is Kai.
 The Tame Crow (den tamme Krage), who is the mate of the field crow and has the run of the princess's palace. She lets Gerda into the royal bedchamber in her search for Kai.
 The Princess (Prinsessen), who desires a prince-consort as intelligent as she, and who finds Gerda in her palace. She helps Gerda in her search for Kai by giving her warm, rich clothing, servants, and a golden coach.
 The Prince (Prinsen), formerly a poor young man, who comes to the palace and passes the test set by the princess to become prince.
 The Old Robber Woman (den gamle Røverkælling), the only woman among the robbers who capture Gerda as she travels through their region in a golden coach.
 The Little Robber Girl (den lille Røverpige), daughter of the robber hag. She takes Gerda as a playmate, whereupon her captive doves and reindeer Bae tell Gerda that Kai is with the Snow Queen. The Robber Girl then helps Gerda continue her journey to find Kai.
 Bae (Bæ), the reindeer who carries Gerda to the Snow Queen's palace.
 The Lappish Woman (Lappekonen), who provides shelter to Gerda and Kai, and writes a message on a dried cod fish to the Finnish Woman further on the way to the Snow Queen's gardens.
 The Finnish Woman (Finnekonen), who lives just two miles away from the Snow Queen's gardens and palace. She knows the secret of Gerda's power to save Kai.

Jenny Lind
Andersen met Swedish opera singer Jenny Lind in 1840, and fell in love with her, but she was not interested in him romantically (although the two became friends). According to Carole Rosen, Andersen was inspired to model the icy-hearted Snow Queen on Lind after she rejected him as a suitor.

Media adaptations

Theatrical films

The Snow Queen (1957), a Soviet animated film by film studio Soyuzmultfilm and directed by Lev Atamanov, later dubbed by Universal Studios with the voices of Sandra Dee as Gerda, Tommy Kirk as Kay and introduced by Art Linkletter. In the 1990s, the film was redubbed again, this time featuring the voices of Kathleen Turner, Mickey Rooney, Kirsten Dunst and Laura San Giacomo.
The Snow Queen (1967), a live-action adaptation from the Soviet Union, directed by Gennadi Kazansky.
Lumikuningatar (1986), a Finnish live-action adaptation.
The Snow Queen (1995), a British animated adaptation, directed by Martin Gates and featuring the voices of Helen Mirren (as the title character), David Jason, Hugh Laurie, Rik Mayall, and Imelda Staunton. This adaptation deviates significantly from the original fairy tale. A sequel, titled The Snow Queen's Revenge, was released the following year.
Marko Raat's Lumekuninganna (2010) takes the story to contemporary time and motivates the character inspired by Kai with love towards an older dying woman.
The Snow Queen, a CG-animated feature film adaptation produced by Russian studio Wizart Animation, Bazelevs Company, and Inlay Film which was released theatrically in Russia on 31 December 2012, internationally on 3 January 2013, and was released in U.S. theaters on 11 October 2013 and U.S. DVD on 26 November 2013. Three theatrical sequels were also released: The Snow Queen 2: The Snow King, The Snow Queen 3: Fire and Ice and The Snow Queen: Mirrorlands.

Television

Hans Christian Andersen Stories (1971) is a Japanese anime series by Mushi Productions and Zuiyo Enterprises and aired on Fuji TV. the 50th and 51st episodes by two parts of the story.
The Snow Queen (1976), a live-action/animated TV movie released by BBC Enterprises (before restructured as BBC Worldwide), produced by Ian Keill and directed by Andrew Gosling.
A 1985 episode of Faerie Tale Theatre starring Melissa Gilbert as Gerda and Lee Remick as the Snow Queen.
Tayna snezhnoy korolevy (The Secret of the Snow Queen) (1986), another live-action adaptation from the Soviet Union, featuring Alisa Freindlich as the Snow Queen.
Anpanman (1988), a long-running series and books created by Takashi Yanase and produced by and animated by TMS Entertainment. The Snow Queen appears in Soreike! Anpanman: Kirakiraboshi no namida and each episodes.
The Snow Queen (1992), an American animated TV short, narrated by Sigourney Weaver.
Snedronningen (2000), a Danish live-action television short adaptation, directed by Jacob Jørgensen and Kristof Kuncewicz.
Snow Queen (2002), a television movie by Hallmark, directed by David Wu and starring Bridget Fonda, Jeremy Guilbaut, Chelsea Hobbs, Robert Wisden, and Wanda Cannon.
The Snow Queen (2005), a BBC television adaptation utilising state of the art effects, merging live-action and computer-generated art. Featuring songs by Paul K. Joyce and starring Juliet Stevenson and the voice of Patrick Stewart, the film was adapted from a 2003 operatic concert held at the Barbican Arts Centre.
The Fairytaler (alternately titled as Tales from H.C. Andersen), a Danish animated television anthology, has a two-part half-hour adaptation directed by Jorgen Lerdam in 2003.
 (2005–2006), a Japanese anime TV series, produced by NHK and animated by TMS Entertainment.
Koscherfilm has been working on its own adaptation of The Snow Queen based on the children's book Gerda and Kai-The Snow Queen Book. Richard Koscher announced the script still looks for the right studio and it was released on Christmas 2012.
Elizabeth Mitchell portrayed the Snow Queen, named Ingrid, in the fourth season of the TV series Once Upon a Time.
In 2017 British children's television channel Cbeebies, aired an adaptation of the story as their Christmas pantomime The Snow Queen. It was a scaled down version of the original story but contained all the major characters and written as a musical. As of December 2017 it is viewable on BBC iPlayer.

Video games
 A text adventure, The Snow Queen, was released by Mosaic Publishing for the ZX Spectrum and Commodore 64 home computers in 1985.
 Rise of the Snow Queen, the 3rd instalment of the Dark Parables Hidden Object PC computer game, is based on both The Snow Queen, & the Snow White fairytale.
Referenced as a play in Megami Ibunroku Persona for the PlayStation. The mask used in the original play is under a curse, and takes the player through a spin-off of the story.
In Cookie Run: Kingdom Frost Queen Cookie, Sherbet Cookie and Cotton Cookie portray said story, alternating the glass shard for an illness.

Operas
An opera The Snow Queen was written in 1913 by Slovenian composer Lucijan Marija Škerjanc, but it was lost and never performed. 
The children's opera История Кая и Герды (The Story of Kai and Gerda) was written in 1980 by Russian composer Sergei Petrovich Banevich, (libretto by Tatiana Kalinina). It premiered at the Mariinsky Theatre (then Kirov Theatre) on 24 December 1980. 
The children's opera The Snow Queen was premiered in 1993 in Toronto as part of the Milk Festival.  This is a 60-minute version of the story by Canadian composer John Greer and English librettist Jeremy James Taylor.  It was commissioned and premiered by the Canadian Children's Opera Company, and subsequently performed by them in 2001 and 2019.  They also toured the work to the Netherlands and Germany in the summer of 2001.
The opera La Regina delle Nevi was written in 2010 by Italian composer Pierangelo Valtinoni (Libretto by Paolo Madron) and premiered at the Komische Oper Berlin on October 24, 2010. The opera has since been translated into English, German, Spanish and Swedish and has been performed in numerous countries.
A family opera "Snödrottningen" in one act with prologue and 13 scenes is composed during 2013-2016 by Swedish composer Benjamin Staern (Libretto by Anelia Kadieva Jonsson) to be premiered at the Malmö Opera on December 17, 2016.
 The Snow Queen, a chamber opera for radio or stage based on Andersen's story, composed by David Ward and libretto by Kevin Ireland.
 Snedronningen (The Snow Queen) is a free adaptation by the composer Hans Abrahamsen which premiered at the Danish Opera House on 13 October 2019 and received its first performance in English at the National Theater in Munich on 21 December 2019.

Stage plays and musicals
The story has been adapted into numerous stage plays and musicals, notably including:
In 1969 Josef Weinberger produced "The Snow Queen", a Musical Play in Two Acts. Based on the story by Hans Andersen, Book and Lyrics by Winifred Palmer, Musical Score adapted by King Palmer from the Music of Edvard Grieg. The author altered Hans Andersens' hero 'Kay' to 'Karl'.
A rock musical adaptation entitled "The Snow Queen: A New Musical". was produced by San Jose Repertory Theatre in December 2013, with music by Haddon Kime, book by Rick Lombardo and Kirsten Brandt, and lyrics by Kime, Brandt, and Lombardo. This adaptation received positive reviews, after also being produced at the 2014 New York Musical Theatre Festival.
An adaptation written by Preston Lane that uses Appalachian culture to tell the story premiered at Triad Stage in 2013.
Another adaptation of "The Snow Queen" made its world premiere at the Hippodrome State Theatre in Gainesville, FL in November 2015. This adaptation was written and directed by Charlie Mitchell, with original songs by Mitchell and Brian Mercer.
"The Snow Queen" was adapted as a radio play by Garrison Keillor, released on September 2, 2010
"The Snow Queen" by Missoula children's theatre played in several locations including Estevan and Humboldt.
"The Snow Queen" was adapted as an audiobook by Jennifer Charles, released by Ojet Records on December 23, 2020

Dance productions
 The first full-length ballet production of The Snow Queen was choreographed and produced by Aerin Holt and California Contemporary Ballet in December 1998 with an original score by Randall Michael Tobin. The ballet ran for 16 consecutive Decembers from 1998 to 2013. In December 2017 The Snow Queen Ballet returns for three performances in celebration of the 20th anniversary of California Contemporary Ballet.
 An Off-Broadway dance theater adaptation of The Snow Queen was choreographed and produced by Angela Jones and Noel MacDuffie in 1999 with an original score by John LaSala. The soundtrack was released as an album on TownHall Records in 2000.
 On 11 October 2007, the English National Ballet premiered a three-act version of The Snow Queen, choreographed by Michael Corder with a score drawn from the music of Sergei Prokofiev's The Stone Flower, arranged by Julian Philips.
 On 23 November 2012, the Finnish National Ballet premiered a two-act version of The Snow Queen, choreographed by Kenneth Greve, music by Tuomas Kantelinen.
 On 22 March 2016, the Grand Theatre, Poznań premiered a two-act version of The Snow Queen, directed by Anna Niedźwiedź, music by Gabriel Kaczmarek.
On 8 April 2017, the Eugene Ballet (OR) premiered a new full-length ballet, The Snow Queen, choreographed by Toni Pimble with original music by Kenji Bunch. The music was released on the Innova Records label to great acclaim.
 Scottish Ballet staged a full-length Snow Queen ballet in two acts, choreographed by Chistopher Hampson and Ashley Page, to a score arranged from music by Nikolai Rimsky-Korsakov in 2018; filmed by BBC television in 2019, rebroadcast 2020. The scenario borrows elements, such as the Snow Queen's sister, the wolves and the splintering palace, from the Walt Disney movie Frozen.

Inspired works
Literature
The Snow Queen by Evgeny Shvarts (1937): A play by the famous Soviet author loosely based on Andersen's tale, with the introduction of new characters such as the Councillor of Commerce, dealing with ice and therefore close ally of the Snow Queen.
The Lion, the Witch, and the Wardrobe (1950): It is possible that the White Witch from C. S. Lewis's novel may be inspired by the Snow Queen, as she turned Narnia into a snow-covered land, is also depicted as wearing a white fur coat and first appears riding in a sleigh, and kidnapped a boy.
The Snow Queen by Joan D. Vinge (1980): A science fiction novel loosely based on Andersen's tale.
Assumptions by Marilyn Hacker (1985): contains an eight-poem sequence, "The Snow Queen," about Gerda, the Robber Girl, and the Finland Woman.
The Snow Queen by Mercedes Lackey (2008): book four of the Five Hundred Kingdoms series, set in a fantasy world where fairy tales happen over and over in a never-ending cycle. The Snow Queen is a harsh persona adopted by a benevolent sorceress (called a Godmother in this world) also known as the Ice Fairy to ensure that the kingdoms under her care get their happy endings. Andersen's tale is featured as a subplot within the novel, which tells an original story incorporating other myths and legends of the Sámi people and of other Scandinavian countries.
In the comic book Fables, the Snow Queen and Kai appear as minor characters.
"The Cryomancer's Daughter (Murder Ballad No. 3)" by Caitlín R. Kiernan is a retelling of The Snow Queen.
"The Player" (1992): Directed by Robert Altman, written by Michael Tolkin.  Several traits of Greta Scachi's character, June Gudmundsdotir, seem to be references to The Snow Queen story.
Winter's Child by Cameron Dokey (2009) is a young adult novel that closely follows the story of "The Snow Queen".
"The Snow Queen's Shadow", by Jim C. Hines (2011), part of his Princess Series. Snow White is transformed into the Snow Queen when a spell goes wrong and her magic mirror shatters.
Breadcrumbs by Anne Ursu is a children's book set in modern times that is heavily inspired by the plot of "The Snow Queen."
 French artist Stéphane Blanquet illustrated a version of the Snow Queen published in France in 2010 by Gallimard Jeunesse
 Ophelia and the Marvelous Boy by Karen Foxleen is a children's book set in modern times featuring the Snow Queen and other elements from the fairy tale.
The book The Raven & The Reindeer by T. Kingfisher is a retelling of Andersen's tale where Gerta (Gerda) finds herself re-examining her attachment to the cold and selfish Kay (Kai) on her journey to rescue him.
The Grimoire of Kensington Market by Lauren B. Davis (2018) is a novel about the opioid epidemic and the effects of addiction on the family and community, inspired by The Snow Queen.

Media
 The webcomic Demon's Mirror is a retelling of The Snow Queen.
A first-season episode of A Different World, "Rudy and the Snow Queen" (1987), involves the character of Whitley Gilbert (Jasmine Guy) retelling the story of the Snow Queen to The Cosby Show'''s Rudy Huxtable (Keshia Knight-Pulliam), who has become so admiring of Whitley that she is ignoring Denise (Lisa Bonet), the older sister that Rudy came to visit. In Whitley's version of the tale, Kai is Gerda's little sister, and Rudy envisions Whitley as the beautiful queen. The crossover episode also includes a cameo appearance by the creator of both series, Bill Cosby, in character as Dr. Heathcliff Huxtable.Sailor Moon S: The Movie (1994) The second movie of the popular anime series Sailor Moon has the Sailor Senshi dealing with a powerful Snow Princess who intends to freeze the entire Earth and make it her possession. The final season of the series Sailor Stars, also heavily borrows from the story for its opening arc; Queen Nehelenia breaks a mirror and the shards of it fall to the earth. One of the fragments get into Mamoru's eye making him cold and distant. When Nehelenia takes him to a palace in the arctic, Sailor Moon must travel there to rescue him. 
A 2000 episode of Happily Ever After: Fairy Tales for Every Child, featuring Eartha Kitt as the voice of the Snow Queen in an Inuit setting.
The Ever After High animated movie, Epic Winter (2016) uses elements of the story.The Huntsman: Winter's War (2016), a prequel and sequel to Snow White and the Huntsman, is based on characters from the German fairy tale "Snow White" compiled by the Brothers Grimm as well as "The Snow Queen" by Hans Christian Andersen.
"The Snow Queen" inspired Seohyun's concept photo for Girls' Generation's third studio album The Boys.
In December, 2011, Blue Tea Games and Big Fish Games released Rise of the Snow Queen, the 3rd instalment of their Dark Parables media franchise.  The storyline features elements from the Brothers Grimm's "Snow White" and Hans Christian Andersen's "The Snow Queen".
The video game Revelations: Persona and its PSP remake made by Atlus, one of the paths the main story can take features the protagonist's school transform into an ice castle. It is ruled by the Snow Queen's mask, who takes over the mind of the protagonist's homeroom teacher. To progress through to story, the player must collect mirror shards to repair a mirror to use against the will of the mask.
The song Schneekönigin (Snow Queen), by the German folk metal group Subway to Sally, tells of the Snow Queen coming to get the narrator, presumably Kai, to bring him back to her land of ice and silence.
The 2013 3D computer-animated musical Walt Disney Animation Studios film Frozen was inspired by "The Snow Queen", and closely followed the original Andersen story early in the film's development. The film has since been adapted to a successful Broadway musical, also produced by Disney. A sequel Frozen II'' was released on November 20 2019.

References

External links

The Snow Queen at the Hans Christian Andersen website
SurLaLune's Annotated The Snow Queen
Free audiobook from LibriVox
SnowQueenBallet.com
The Snow Queen: A New Musical
 

1844 short stories
Danish fairy tales
Short stories by Hans Christian Andersen
Fictional characters with ice or cold abilities
Fictional queens
Female literary villains
Fictional princesses
Fictional Finnish people
Fictional witches
The Devil in fairy tales
Witchcraft in fairy tales
Literary characters introduced in 1845
Female characters in fairy tales